Pemulwuy (also rendered as Pimbloy, Pemulvoy, Pemulwoy, Pemulwy or Pemulwye, or sometimes by contemporary Europeans as Bimblewove, Bumbleway or Bembulwoyan) (c. 1750 – 2 June 1802) was a Bidjigal man of the Eora nation, born around 1750 in the area of Botany Bay in New South Wales, Australia. One of the most famous Aboriginal resistance fighters in the colonial era, he is noted for his resistance to European colonisation which began with the arrival of the First Fleet in January 1788. 

Pemulwuy lived near Botany Bay, which he would have known as Kamay in the Dharug language. Pemulwuy is considered to have been a carradhy (cleverman), an Eora spiritual healer and culture keeper.

Before his resistance effort, Pemulwuy would hunt meat and provide it to the food-challenged new colony in exchange for goods. 

In 1790 Pemulwuy began a twelve-year guerrilla war against the colonists, which continued until his assassination.

When Pemulwuy grew into manhood he became Bembul Wuyan, which represents "the earth and the crow". According to Indigenous activist Richard Green, "he wasn't very impressed with the mix of cultures. He preferred that we stayed within our own peoples". Another name for him was Butu Wargun, which means "crow".

Early life
Pemulwuy was born with a turned eyeball or other blemish in his left eye. According to historian Eric Willmot:
Normally, a child that showed an obvious deformity would've been, well, people would have expected that child to be sent back, to be reborn again. It was generally thought that humans, like everything, came from the land. And that a woman, the actual act of conception, was a woman being infected by a child's spirit from the land. And that child grows within her. And so he was different and he became more different. He became better than everybody else. Whatever anyone else could do, Pemulwuy did it better. He could run further, he was one of the best, he could use a spear like no-one else could. And so, around him, was created an aura of difference. So much so that he was said to be a clever man. In an Aboriginal society, clever man is often a man who deals with the spiritual nature of things and sorcery even.His contemporary Colebe said that Pemulwuy's left foot was distinctive as it had been damaged by a club, perhaps to mark him as a carradhy (cleverman or healer). The Kurdaitcha (ritual executioners and lawmen) of Central Australia similarly have a foot deliberately mutilated.

His people, the Bidjigal are the original inhabitants of Toongabbie and Parramatta in Sydney.

Conflict with settlers

Spearing of McIntyre
On 9 December 1790, a shooting party left for Botany Bay, including a sergeant of marines and three convicts, including Governor Phillip's gamekeeper John McIntyre. According to Watkin Tench:
About one o’clock, the sergeant was awakened by a rustling noise in the bushes near him, and supposing it to proceed from a kangaroo, called to his comrades, who instantly jumped up. On looking about more narrowly, they saw two natives with spears in their hands, creeping towards them, and three others a little farther behind. As this naturally created alarm, McIntyre said, "don’t be afraid, I know them", and immediately laying down his gun, stepped forward, and spoke to them in their own language. The Indians, finding they were discovered, kept slowly retreating, and McIntyre accompanied them about a hundred yards, talking familiarly all the while. One of them now jumped on a fallen tree and, without giving the least warning of his intention, launched his spear at McIntyre and lodged it in his left side. The person who committed this wanton act was described as a young man with a speck or blemish on his left eye. That he had been lately among us was evident from his being newly shaved.
The group was pursued by the settlers with muskets, but they escaped. McIntyre was taken back to the settlement, gravely wounded. Tench suspected that McIntyre had previously killed Aboriginal people, and noted the fear and hatred that the Aboriginal people, including Bennelong (an Aboriginal man whom Governor Phillip had captured, in the hope of interaction with the Aboriginal people) showed towards him.

Governor Phillip's military expeditions
An irate Governor Phillip ordered Lieutenant Tench to gather his company of marines and lead an expedition against the Bidjigal in retaliation for Pemulwuy's attack on McIntyre.  He ordered that two Bidjigal were to be captured and ten killed; these ten were then to be beheaded and the heads returned to the settlement. Tench swiftly suggested an alternative and less bloodthirsty plan, that six Bidjigal be captured and brought to Sydney Cove but that none be killed out of hand.

Tench's proposal was accepted, and the expedition set out on 14 December in search of Pemulwuy and the Bidjigal tribe. The expedition was the largest military operation since the founding of the colony, comprising Tench, Lieutenants William Dawes and John Poulden, and 46 marines. However, despite three days of searching there was no sign of the Bidjigal. On 17 December, Tench ordered a return to Sydney Cove to gather supplies.

Resistance
Pemulwuy persuaded the Eora, Dharug and Tharawal people to join his campaign against the settlers. From 1792 Pemulwuy led raids on British colonists at Parramatta, Georges River, Prospect, Toongabbie, Brickfield and Hawkesbury River.  His most common tactic was to burn crops and kill livestock. In May 1795, Pemulwuy or one of his followers speared a convict near present-day Chippendale.

In December 1795, Pemulwuy and his warriors attacked a work party at Botany Bay which included "Black Caesar", one of the earliest settlers of African descent and a well-known bushranger. Caesar managed to crack Pemulwuy's skull and many thought he had killed him, but he survived.

Escape
Despite still having buckshot in his head and body, and wearing a leg-iron, Pemulwuy escaped from the hospital. This added to the belief that he was a carradhy.

Pemulwuy resumed his fighting against the colonists by November 1797. However, his injuries had affected his ability as a fighter and his resistance was on a smaller and more sporadic scale for the rest of his life.

Convicts William Knight and Thomas Thrush escaped and joined the Aboriginal resistance.

According to Richard Green, "with simple spears, rocks, boomerangs, stones, he [Pemulwuy] defeated the British army that they sent here. Every single soldier except for Watkin Tench, that they sent in pursuit of Pemulwuy either walked back into the community with their saddle over their shoulders or they didn't make it back".

Death
Governor Philip Gidley King issued an order on 22 November 1801 to bring Pemulwuy in dead or alive, with an associated reward. The order attributed the killing of two men, the dangerous wounding of several others, and a number of robberies, to Pemulwuy.

On 2 June 1802, Pemulwuy was shot and killed by explorer and sailor Henry Hacking, the first mate of the Royal Navy ship .

"After being wounded, all the people believed that he was immune to British bullets," says Richard Green. "So he'd stand out in front and, you know, stand right out in front of them and take them on, you know? So after 12 years, his time ran out. He got his shot and he took it."

Following the death of Pemulwuy, Governor King wrote to Lord Hobart that on the death of Pemulwuy he was given his head by the Aboriginal people as Pemulwuy "had been the cause of all that had happened".  The Governor issued orders with immediate effect to not "molest or ill-treat any native", and to re-admit them to the areas of Parramatta and Prospect from which they had been forcibly excluded.

Pemulwuy's head was preserved in spirits. It was sent to England to Sir Joseph Banks accompanied by a letter from Governor King, who wrote: "Although a terrible pest to the colony, he was a brave and independent character."

Pemulwuy's son Tedbury continued fighting for a number of years before being killed in 1810.

The circumstances relating to Pemulwuy's death and the fate of his remains was described by the Sydney Morning Herald in 2003 as "Australia's oldest murder mystery".

Skull
Repatriation of the skull of Pemulwuy has been requested by Sydney Aboriginal people. In 2010, Prince William announced he would return Pemulwuy's skull to his Aboriginal relatives. One trail led to the Natural History Museum in London, but the museum has no record of the skull, and it has not yet been able to be located among the estimated 3,000 other remains of Aboriginal people in the UK.

Legacy
The Sydney suburb of Pemulwuy, New South Wales is named after him, as well as Pemulwuy Park in Redfern, New South Wales.

In the 1980s the band Redgum composed a song about Pemulwuy entitled "Water and Stone".

The first song on James Asher's 1996 new age album Feet in the Soil is entitled "Pemulwuy", and the last song is entitled "Pemulwuy Returns". Both feature didgeridoos.

Australian composer Paul Jarman composed a choral work entitled Pemulwuy.  It has become an Australian choral standard, and was performed by the Biralee Blokes in their victory in the ABC Choir of the Year 2006.

In 1987 Weldons published Pemulwuy: The Rainbow Warrior by Eric Willmot, a best-selling novel providing a fictionalised account using early colonial documents as source. Matilda Media re-released the book in 1994.

The redevelopment of The Block in the Sydney suburb of Redfern by the Aboriginal Housing Company was named the Pemulwuy Project.

In 2008, Marlene Cummins released an eponymous song about Pemulwuy. This was later presented to Prince William along with a petition to bring Pemulwuy's head back to his people.

In 2009, a remote boxing game for the Wii console, Pemulwuy Dream Team, was developed.

In 2015, the National Museum of Australia installed a plaque honouring his role in Australian history as part of the Defining Moments project.

In 2017, a Sydney Ferries Emerald-class ferry was named Pemulwuy.

See also 

 Australian frontier wars
 Jandamarra of the Bunuba nation
 Kurdaitcha, who are also marked through deliberate damage to the foot
 Musquito a warrior of the Gai-Mariagal clan
 Tunnerminnerwait was an Australian aboriginal resistance fighter and Parperloihener clansman from Tasmania
 Windradyne warrior and resistance leader of the Wiradjuri nation
 Yagan, a warrior and resistance leader of the Noongar tribe, in what is now the area around Perth, Western Australia

References

Sources

Further reading
 Dark, Eleanor, 1947, The Timeless Land, also uses early colonial documents as source, including a recount of unsuccessful search for Pemulwuy by Arthur Phillip's officers.

 Richards, D. Manning (2012). Destiny in Sydney: An epic novel of convicts, Aborigines, and Chinese embroiled in the birth of Sydney, Australia. First book in Sydney series. Washington DC: Aries Books. 
 Willmot, E., 1987, Pemulwuy – The Rainbow Warrior, Weldons. A fictionalised recount using early colonial documents as source.

1802 deaths
Eora people
History of Sydney
History of Australia (1788–1850)
1750 births
Wars of independence
Conflicts in 1790
Conflicts in 1797
1790s in Australia
1800s in Australia
People of the Australian frontier wars